The 2000 season was the ninth full year of competitive football (soccer) in Estonia since gaining independence from the Soviet Union on 20 August 1991.

National Leagues

Meistriliiga

Esiliiga

Estonian FA Cup

Final

Estonian Super Cup

National Team

Notes

External links
2000 season on RSSSF
RSSSF Historic Results
RSSSF National Team Results

 
Seasons in Estonian football